Mohammadabad Rural District is a rural district (dehestan) in the Central District of Zarand County, Kerman Province, Iran. At the 2006 census, its population was 13,252, in 3,232 families. The rural district has 15 villages.

References 

Rural Districts of Kerman Province
Zarand County